Sam, or Songum, is a Madang language spoken in Madang Province, Papua New Guinea.

It is spoken in Songum, Buan, and Wongbe villages in Astrolabe Bay Rural LLG.

'Sam' is the word for 'language'. 'Songum' is a village name.

Phonology

Consonants

Vowels

References

Mindjim languages
Languages of Madang Province